Ely State Prison (ESP) is a maximum security penitentiary located in unincorporated White Pine County, Nevada, about  north of Ely. The facility, operated by the Nevada Department of Corrections, opened in July 1989.  the prison has a staff of 406 and is a major employer in the Ely area. As of September 2010, the prison housed 1,077 male inmates.

The state's death row for men is located at Ely State Prison, as is the execution chamber, which opened in 2016.

History
Residents of Ely, Nevada spent a year and $25,000 lobbying for the prison to be built in the area. On December 19, 1985, the prison was unanimously approved by the finance committees of the Nevada Legislature to be built in the Ely area. The prison opened in July 1989. Phase I was completed and opened in August of that year. Phase II was completed November 1990. Originally Ely had a capacity of 1,054; as of 2010 its capacity is for 1,150. The prison has a staff of 406 and is a major employer in the Ely area.

Allegations of inadequate medical care and ACLU lawsuit
Ely State Prison was the recipient of numerous criticisms by the American Civil Liberties Union (ACLU) regarding its alleged failure to provide adequate medical care to its inmates.

Dr. William Noel, a medical expert retained by the ACLU, produced a report in December 2007 that described his review of the medical records of 35 prisoners from ESP. He wrote that "the medical care provided at Ely State Prison amounts to the grossest possible medical malpractice, and the most shocking and callous disregard for human life and human suffering, that I have ever encountered in the medical profession in my thirty-five years of practice."

His report describes in detail the death of Patrick Cavanaugh, an inmate who he claims died due to complications of diabetes, after having received no insulin for a period of three years and having his ulcerated legs left to fester without treatment or amputation. The report also mentions accounts of wholly untreated cases of chronic pain, hepatitis, fibromyalgia, rheumatoid arthritis and syphilis.  The report also notes cases in which an epileptic patient was not regularly equipped with a helmet; in which a stroke sufferer was not given any physical therapy nor even an arm brace to prevent the eventual contraction of his affected limb; and in which a patient was switched back to a potentially lethal medication.

On January 23, 2008, the ACLU met with the Nevada State Board of Prison Commissioners seeking a consent decree which would voluntarily have let a federal court oversee prison medical care. Nevada Governor Jim Gibbons and other commissioners were presented with a report by NDOC Director Howard Skolnik and Medical Director Dr. Robert Bannister refuting Noel's findings. The commissioners rejected the ACLU's request.

On March 6, 2009, the ACLU filed a lawsuit against the Nevada Department of Corrections, Governor Gibbons and other state officials. In it, they sought to have a federal judge find that the Department of Corrections had not provided inmates with adequate medical care. The suit was settled in July 2010, with the NDOC agreeing to appoint an independent medical expert to monitor the prison's health care system and to submit regular reports evaluating officials' compliance with various medical requirements. It was also agreed that nurses would make daily rounds at the prison to pick up medical request forms and that inmates would have access to a registered nurse or higher level practitioner within 48 hours of requesting medical attention.

Men's death row and execution chamber
The men's death row is located at Ely.  there are 57 prisoners on that death row.

The state execution chamber at Ely was built in 2016. The Nevada Legislature agreed to spend almost $860,000 to build it. A Las Vegas company,  Kittrell Garlock & Associates, designed the chamber. The execution chamber was previously the prison courtroom, and it also functions as a private meeting place for attorneys. At that time no executions were scheduled due to a lack of execution drugs available. Previously executions by the state of Nevada were to be carried out at Nevada State Prison, even though the facility closed due to budget issues in 2012. In 2012 the department was considering a capital improvement program that would relocate the execution chamber from Nevada State Prison to Ely State Prison, which was later done in 2016.

Notable inmates

See also

Capital punishment in Nevada
List of Nevada state prisons

References

External links
Ely State Prison at the Nevada Department of Corrections (Official site)

Prisons in Nevada
Buildings and structures in White Pine County, Nevada
Capital punishment in the United States
Execution sites in the United States
1989 establishments in Nevada